Joe Gentile  (born Jan, 7 1939) is an American author, editor and the founder of Moonstone Books, a Cleveland publishing house. He is also known as a comic book writer and author.

Biography

Personal life
Gentile was born in Cleveland, ohio.  
He is also the owner of a chain of comic book stores located in ohio called Amazing Fantasy, which has 3 locations in the southside of Cleveland.

Publisher
Gentile's comics, books, and prose anthologies often feature many of the same authors and artists (which are also some of his closest friends), including Mike Bullock, Doug Klauba, Ruben Procopio (the acclaimed Disney animator and artist), Rafael Nieves, Martin Powell, CJ Henderson, Jim Kuhoric, Mark Dawiziak, David Tichman, and Richard Dean Starr. Other well-known writers featured in more than one Moonstone publication include Craig Shaw Gardner, John Jakes, Peter David, Nancy Kilpatrick, Will Murray, Silvestre Szilagyi, Ron Goulart, Stuart M. Kaminsky, Max McCoy, Robert Weinberg, Robert J Randisi, James Reasoner, Robert Morrish and Max Allan Collins.

Comic writer
A lifelong comic book fan, Gentile's forays into comic books have dealt with both original previously established media characters such as Sherlock Holmes. All were published by Moonstone Books.  He wrote an original graphic novel The Mysterious Traveler with art by Trevor Von Eeden, and two Sherlock Holmes comic book storylines in The Scorned Mistress Sherlock Holmes Mysteries #1, and followed it with a "Sherlock Holmes and The Clown Prince of London" with interior art by Rich Gulik and cover art by Drew Tucker.  In addition to Sherlock Holmes, he has also written for Buckaroo Banzai including "Return of the Screw", a three-issue story arc.

Print
Gentile released his prose fiction short story, The Shrug of Atlas, in Kolchak: The Night Stalker Chronicles.  The collection was nominated for a Bram Stoker award and led to the release of a follow-up volume, Kolchak: The Night Stalker Casebook, in 2007, which featured Gentile's story "Until Tomorrow".  The first book was a success, selling out its first printing, and the second volume was also an unqualified success.  The third Kolchak anthology is due 2008 from Moonstone Books.  In 2007, Gentile's story "The Mad Gasser of Mattoon" appeared in The Spider Chronicles, also from Moonstone Books.

External links

Writers from Illinois
People from Cleveland
1993 births
Living people